Caladenia atrovespa, commonly known as the thin-clubbed mantis orchid, is a plant in the orchid family Orchidaceae and is endemic to New South Wales.  It is a terrestrial, perennial, deciduous, herb with an underground tuber and a single hairy leaf. 
The species was first formally described by David Jones in 2008 and given the name Arachnorchis atrovespa from a specimen collected on Black Mountain in the Australian Capital Territory. The description was published in The Orchadian. In 2010, Gary Backhouse changed the name to Caladenia atrovespa. The specific epithet (atrovespa) is derived from the Latin words atra meaning "black" and vespa meaning "wasp".

References

atrovespa
Plants described in 2008
Endemic orchids of Australia
Orchids of New South Wales
Taxa named by David L. Jones (botanist)